Līga Dekmeijere and Jelena Pandžić were the defending champions, having won the previous event in 2008. However, Dekmeijere has been inactive on the women's tour since 2015, while Pandžić retired from the professional circuit in 2017.

Jovana Jakšić and Renata Zarazúa won the title after defeating Sanaz Marand and Whitney Osuigwe 6–3, 5–7, [10–4] in the final.

Seeds

Draw

Draw

References
Main Draw

Braidy Industries Women's Tennis Classic - Doubles